Yusuke Maeda (前田 悠佑, born 23 November 1984) is a retired Japanese footballer who played as a midfielder for V-Varen Nagasaki.

Career
After a long career spent with V-Varen Nagasaki, Maeda opted to retire after his side got relegated from J1 in their maiden season in the top tier.

Career statistics
Updated to 23 December 2018.

References

External links 
 

Profile at V-Varen Nagasaki

1984 births
Living people
Seinan Gakuin University alumni
Association football people from Fukuoka Prefecture
Japanese footballers
J1 League players
J2 League players
Japan Football League players
Honda Lock SC players
V-Varen Nagasaki players
Association football midfielders